In military terms, a Lieutenants Protection Association (sometimes also called a "Lieutenants Protection Agency" or "LPA") is an informal group of junior officers.  Many young officers find the Lieutenant Protection Association/Agency community is the best way to make an impact and a successful start to their military career once in the fleet.

Depending the unit, the LPA may base membership on being a "one bar," and include Warrant Officers.

Honorary membership
Unit LPAs may extend honorary membership, or limited membership, to servicemembers of other ranks. These individuals will be included based on vague, subjective qualifications.

External links
 theLPA.org

Military organization